Viktor Spiridonovich Gozhy (born 10 July 1946, in Ukraine) is a Russian politician, former First vice-chairman of the Jewish Autonomous Oblast. He is the next in the line of succession after the Chairman of the Government, Nikolay Mikhaylovich Volkov.

See also
List of Jewish Autonomous Oblast Leaders

References

1946 births
Place of birth missing (living people)
Jewish Autonomous Oblast politicians
Living people